James McCourt may refer to:

James McCourt (writer)
James McCourt (TV host)
James McCourt (footballer), Scottish footballer 
James Henry McCourt, politician
Jim McCourt, boxer